Nemanja Šćekić (Cyrillic: Немања Шћeкић, born 17 December 1991) is a Montenegrin football goalkeeper.

Club career
Born in Berane, he played with FK Čukarički Stankom in the 2010–11 Serbian SuperLiga.  As Čukarički got relegated at the end of the season, Ščekić returned to Montenegro and joined First League side FK Mogren.  On 10 February 2017, he signed for  years with Bulgarian club Montana. On 7 September 2017, his contract was terminated by mutual consent.

International career
He has been part of the Montenegrin under-21 team since late 2010.

References

External sources
 

1991 births
Living people
People from Berane
Association football goalkeepers
Montenegrin footballers
Montenegro under-21 international footballers
FK Čukarički players
FK Mogren players
Békéscsaba 1912 Előre footballers
FK Sinđelić Beograd players
FC Montana players
FK Javor Ivanjica players
FK Zemun players
OFK Žarkovo players
FK Metalac Gornji Milanovac players
Serbian SuperLiga players
Montenegrin First League players
Nemzeti Bajnokság I players
Serbian First League players
First Professional Football League (Bulgaria) players
Second Professional Football League (Bulgaria) players
Montenegrin expatriate footballers
Expatriate footballers in Serbia
Expatriate footballers in Hungary
Expatriate footballers in Bulgaria
Montenegrin expatriate sportspeople in Serbia
Montenegrin expatriate sportspeople in Hungary
Montenegrin expatriate sportspeople in Bulgaria